Eric Francis Huxtable (27 October 1908 – 10 October 1990) was an Australian rules footballer who played for Carlton in the VFL during the 1930s and briefly with South Melbourne in the early 1940s.

Family
Eric married his wife Gwynneth in May 1935 and has six children, Neil, Gary, Erin, Margo, Christine and Julie.

Football
Huxtable was aged just 15 when he started his career at Tasmanian club New Town and in 1928 won their 'Best and fairest' award.

In 1930 he went to the mainland and joined Carlton, becoming a regular member of their defence throughout the decade. Noted for his long drop kicks, Huxtable had success during his career against triple Brownlow winner Haydn Bunton and was a regular Big V representative. He consistently played finals football while at Carlton, including the losing 1932 VFL Grand Final against Richmond. In his last season with Carlton the club won the premiership but Huxtable missed out on participating due to a thumb injury.

After leaving Carlton, Huxtable served two years in the RAAF but made a return to the VFL in 1941 with South Melbourne.

Notes

References
 Holmesby, Russell and Main, Jim (2007). The Encyclopedia of AFL Footballers. 7th ed. Melbourne: Bas Publishing.

External links
 
 

1908 births
1990 deaths
Australian rules footballers from Hobart
Australian Rules footballers: place kick exponents
Carlton Football Club players
Sydney Swans players
Glenorchy Football Club players
Tasmanian Football Hall of Fame inductees
Royal Australian Air Force personnel of World War II
Military personnel from Tasmania